Trimellitic anhydride chloride is a chemical compound used to produce polyamide-imide plastic.

See also
 Mellitic acid
 Trimellitic anhydride

References

Acyl chlorides
Phthalic anhydrides
Organochlorides